Givira theodori is a moth in the family Cossidae. It is found in the United States, where it has been recorded from Arizona, Colorado, Utah, New Mexico and Texas.

The wingspan is about 26 mm. Adults have been recorded on wing from April to September.

Etymology
The species is named in honor of Theodore Dru Alison Cockerell, who collected the species.

References

Natural History Museum Lepidoptera generic names catalog

Givira
Moths described in 1893